Asthenotricha is a genus of moths in the family Geometridae.

Species
The dentatissima group
Asthenotricha amblycoma Prout, 1935
Asthenotricha anisobapta Prout, 1932
Asthenotricha ansorgei Warren, 1899
Asthenotricha barnsae Prout, 1935
Asthenotricha comosissima Herbulot, 1970
Asthenotricha deficiens Herbulot, 1954
Asthenotricha dentatissima Warren, 1899
Asthenotricha fernandi Prout, 1935
Asthenotricha flavicoma Warren, 1899
Asthenotricha furtiva Herbulot, 1960
Asthenotricha grandis Herbulot, 1997
Asthenotricha lophopterata (Guenée, [1858])
Asthenotricha malostigma Prout, 1921
Asthenotricha nesiotes Herbulot, 1954
Asthenotricha parabolica Herbulot, 1954
Asthenotricha polydora Debauche, 1938
Asthenotricha proschora D. S. Fletcher, 1958
Asthenotricha psephotaenia Prout, 1935
Asthenotricha pycnoconia Janse, 1933
Asthenotricha pythia Debauche, 1938
Asthenotricha quadrata Herbulot, 1960
Asthenotricha semidivisa Warren, 1901
Asthenotricha serraticornis Warren, 1902
Asthenotricha straba Prout, 1921
Asthenotricha torata Prout, 1932
Asthenotricha tripogonias Prout, 1926
The argyridia group
Asthenotricha argyridia (Butler, 1894)
Asthenotricha candace (Prout, 1929)
Asthenotricha costalis (Aurivillius, 1910)
Asthenotricha inutilis Warren, 1901
Asthenotricha meruana (Aurivillius, 1910)
Asthenotricha sjostedti (Aurivillius, 1910)
Asthenotricha strangulata Herbulot, 1953
Asthenotricha unipecten (Prout, 1915)

References

External links
 

 
Asthenini
Geometridae genera